Silver Creek Township is an inactive township in Randolph County, in the U.S. state of Missouri.

Silver Creek Township takes its name from Silver Creek.

References

Townships in Missouri
Townships in Randolph County, Missouri